Bilene Airport  is an airport that serves the town of Bilene, Mozambique.

Airlines and Destinations 
The airport is currently out of service

References

External links 
  Transairways

Airports in Mozambique
Bilene Macia District